Patrik Kuril is a Slovak cyclist. He won a gold medal at the 2020 Summer Paralympics in the Men's road time trial C4 and a bronze medal at the 2016 Summer Paralympics in the Men's road time trial C4.

He is also the current C4 Road Cycling World Champion in the 92.4 km Road Race.

References

Living people
Para-cyclists
Paralympic bronze medalists for Slovakia
Paralympic gold medalists for Slovakia
Cyclists at the 2016 Summer Paralympics
Cyclists at the 2020 Summer Paralympics
Medalists at the 2016 Summer Paralympics
Medalists at the 2020 Summer Paralympics
1979 births
People from Partizánske
Sportspeople from the Trenčín Region